In Latin, there are different modes of indicating past, present and future processes. There is the basic mode of free clauses and there are multiple dependent modes found exclusively in dependent clauses. In particular, there is the 'infinitive' mode for reported satetements and the 'subjunctive' mode for reported questions.

Tenses in 'infinitive' mode 

In reports of statements or ideas and in statements of facts known by others, the subject is represented by an 'accusative' noun and the event is represented by an 'infinitive' verb or verb group. For this reason, the structure of a reported statement is known as 'accusative and infinitive'. Usually an 'infinitive' verb or verb group represents an event at relative time: the event is either future, present or past at the time of the reported statement. Often the verb of speaking, knowing, expecting or hoping is omitted, but can be recovered from the context of discourse or situation.

Secondary tense

Secondary future 

'Infinitive' verb groups can represent an event that is future at the time of saying, knowing, expecting or hoping.

The 'active infinitive' mode is often realised by a simple accusative future participle. The 'passive infinitive' mode can be realised by the ' infinitive' paradigm of the perfect periphrasis, but this option is comparatively rare. There are three additional future infinitive periphrases for both active and passive/deponent verbs.

Secondary present 

A 'present infinitive' verb represents an event that is present at the time of stating, perceiving or knowing.

Secondary past 

For active verbs, A 'perfect infinitive' verb represents an event that is past at the time of stating, perceiving or knowing. Alternatively, the 'present infinitive' paradigms of the "habeō" perfect periphrasis can also represent a past event at the time of stating, stressing that the result is present at that time.

For passitve and deponent verbs, the relative past event is represented by either the 'present infinitive' paradigm of the perfect periphrasis or a simple accusative perfect participle.

When it comes to remembering, a 'present infinitive' verb represents an event that is present at the time of perceiving, but past at the time of remembering.

Tertiary tense

Tertiary past 

For both passive and deponent verbs, the ' infinitive' paradigm of the perfect periphrasis can be used in reported statements for an event that is past at the time of another event, which is future at the time of the statement ('that x would soon have done', 'that x will soon have done').

Occasionally a 'perfect infinitive' paradigm of the perfect periphrasis is found. While the perfect periphrasis with the 'present infinitive' auxiliary  merely refers to an event which took place before the time of the reported statement (e.g. 'he reported that Marcellus had been killed'), the perfect periphrasis with 'perfect infinitive' auxiliary  has two markers of past and it refers to an event prior to another event, which is also prior to the reported statement. Thus there are three times involved: the primary is the time of stating, the secondary is the time of another event, and the tertiary is the time of the event represented by the perfect periphrasis.

Just as a 'perfect indicative' verb can represent either a past event or the present result (e.g. 'he has died' = 'he is dead'), so the perfect periphrasis with the 'perfect infinitive' auxiliary  often represent either a past-in-past event or present-in-past result at the time of the reported statement.

Tenses in 'subjunctive' mode 

For acts of asking, wondering and hoping, events are represented in the 'subjunctive' mode in the reported locutions or ideas. Dependent clauses representing the cause of the dominant clause are also in the 'subjunctive' mode. This applies to multiple causal conjunctions such as the causal , the causal , the final /, the final  and the final .

Secondary tenses

Secondary future

Secondary present

Secondary past

Tertiary tense

Tertiary past 

In 'if' clauses within reported locutions, a 'present subjunctive' verb can represent a 'relative perfect' event at the time of another event, as long as that other event takes place after the time of the reported locution.

Expansive meanings

Tenses in 'subjunctive' mode for conditional clauses 

The following unfulfillable wish also uses the double pluperfect subjunctive passive:

 (Virgil)
'I wish she had never been seized by such love of warfare or attempted to provoke the Trojans!'

Imperfect subjunctive + pluperfect subjunctive:

 (Cicero)
'I wish it had been true'

When the main verb is primary, an imperfect or pluperfect subjunctive in a clause that is already subordinate in the original sentence may often remain:

 (Livy)
'tell us what you would have done if you had been censor?'

In other examples in reported speech, the subjunctive in the 'if' clause represents an original present subjunctive with potential meaning:

 (Cicero)
'I believe that Pleasure, if she were to speak for herself, would give way to Dignity'

In some sentences, the pluperfect subjunctive is a reflection of an original imperfect indicative, as in the following example, where the original verbs would have been  and :

 (Livy)
'[he said] that they begged just one favour, that they should be not assigned lower ranks than those which they had held when they were on military service'

In other sentences, the pluperfect subjunctive is a transformation of a future perfect indicative, put into historic sequence. The original words of the following sentence would presumably have been  'if you do (will have done) otherwise, you will be doing Caesar a disservice':

 (Cicero)
'he said that if the man were to do otherwise, he would be doing Caesar a disservice'

 (Livy)
'at this critical moment in the battle, the propraetor vowed games to Jupiter, if he routed and slaughtered the enemies'

Tenses in 'subjunctive' mode for causal clauses 

Verbs in subordinate clauses in indirect speech are also almost always in the subjunctive mood. This also applies to subordinate clauses when the indirect speech is only implied rather than explicit. Both of the following examples have the perfect subjunctive:

 (Cicero)
'Caesar is pardoning me by means of a letter for the fact that I didn't come'

 (Plautus)
'my mother is angry because I didn't return'

Latin grammar

References